= Nishihara, Kashiwa =

Nishihara (西原) is a district of Kashiwa, Chiba, Japan.

As of November, 2017, the population of this district is 9,667. The postal code for Nishihara is 277-0885.
